Lieutenant Colonel Jean André Pezon began his military career during World War I and became a flying ace credited with ten confirmed aerial victories. He served his nation throughout World War II.

Early life

Jean André Pezon was born in Saint-Pierre-le-Moûtier on 19 March 1898.

World War I
Pezon volunteered for military service on 4 September 1915, while he was still 17 years old. He was assigned to various artillery units until he was forwarded to Dijon for pilot's training on 27 February 1917. He moved on to Étampes on 12 March. On 22 May 1917, he was awarded Military Pilot's Brevet No. 6485. On 7 August, he was promoted to enlisted Brigadier and forwarded to Avord and Pau for advanced training.

On 1 January 1918, Pezon was assigned to Escadrille 90 as a Spad fighter pilot. On 16 March, he was promoted to Maréchal-des-logis. On 17 May 1918, he began his campaign against German aerial observers by teaming with Marius Ambrogi to destroy an enemy observation balloon near Juville. Cooperating with Ambrogi, Maurice Bizot, Charles J. V. Macé, and other French pilots, Pezon drove his score as a balloon buster to nine by 29 October 1918; he also downed a German two-seater reconnaissance plane.

Pezon's professional success paralleled his victory string. He was advanced to Adjutant on 25 June 1918. He was awarded the Médaille militaire on 5 October to add to his Croix de guerre; the text of the accompanying citation noted, "He has returned frequently from missions with his plane rendered unfit for further use by enemy fire."

Post World War I
On 22 June 1919, having been mentioned six times in dispatches, he was appointed a Chevalier de la Légion d'honneur; the citation noted that he pressed home an attack on a German troop train to "within 30 metres". On 16 August, he was commissioned a Sous lieutenant. Exactly two years later, he was promoted to Lieutenant.

He was elevated within the Légion d'honneur in 1936, becoming an Officier. The following year, on 14 July, he was promoted to Captain; it was a reserve commission.

On 25 June 1944, he was again promoted within the reserves, to Commandant. On 1 February 1952, he received his final promotion, to lieutenant colonel. The last day of 1952, the Légion d'honneur made him a Commandeur. He was also appointed an Officier in the Tunisian Ordre du Micham-Iftikhar.

When Jean Andre Pezon died on 24 August 1980, he was the last known living French ace from World War I.

Honors and awards

A fearless pilot with the will to prove it to all. He has rendered valuable service for the army by carrying out 20 severe combats in a scout, at low altitude and with particularly favorable results. He reported his third victory on 2 September 1918 by downing a balloon in flames, which he followed to the ground. He has returned frequently from missions with his plane rendered unfit for further use by enemy fire. Four citations.  citation, 5 October 1918
 
Chevalier de la Légion d'Honneur

A very brave non-commissioned officer. A pilot of the first order who gained ten official victories and never ceased to distinguish himself in his Escadrille by his spirit of initiative and remarkable dash. On 30 March 1918, he descended to within less than 30 meters of the station at Château-Salins, to strafe a train transporting enemy troops, killing 17 and wounding 28. He returned to his airfield with a plane riddled by bullets and shrapnel, in spite of the anti-aircraft barrages. Médaille Militaire for feats of war. Six citations. Chevalier de la Légion d'Honneur citation, 22 June 1919

Endnotes

References
 Over the Front: A Complete Record of the Fighter Aces and Units of the United States and French Air Services, 1914-1918 (1992). Norman L. R. Franks, Frank W. Bailey. Grub Street. , .

External links
 The Aerodrome website page on Pezon:  Retrieved 11 November 2017.

1898 births
1980 deaths
French World War I flying aces
French World War II pilots